is a Japanese professional baseball infielder for the Hanshin Tigers in Japan's Nippon Professional Baseball.

External links

NPB stats

1985 births
Living people
Baseball people from Ibaraki Prefecture
Japanese baseball players
Nippon Professional Baseball infielders
Osaka Kintetsu Buffaloes players
Tohoku Rakuten Golden Eagles players
Hanshin Tigers players